is a railway station located in the city of Noshiro, Akita, Japan, operated by the East Japan Railway Company (JR East).

Lines
Futatsui Station is served by the Ōu Main Line, and is located 372.2 km from the terminus of the line at Fukushima Station

Station layout
The station consists of one side platform and one island platform, connected to the station building by a footbridge. The Midori no Madoguchi was closed in March 2021. The station is staffed.

Platforms

History
Futatsui Station was opened on November 1, 1901, as a station on the Japanese Government Railways (JGR), serving the town of Nanakura, Akita. The Nakanishi Tokugoro Light Railway connected to this station from September 25, 1922, to March 1, 1940. The JGR became the Japan National Railways (JNR) after World War II. The station was absorbed into the JR East network upon the privatization of the JNR on April 1, 1987.

Passenger statistics
In fiscal 2018, the station was used by an average of 303 passengers daily (boarding passengers only).

Surrounding area
 former Futatsui Town Hall
 Futatsui High School

References

External links

 JR East Station information 

Railway stations in Japan opened in 1901
Railway stations in Akita Prefecture
Ōu Main Line
Noshiro, Akita